José Rodríguez Davié (14 May, 1867 – 13 September, 1899), also known as Pepete, was a Spanish bullfighter.

Rodríguez Davié was born in San Fernando, Cádiz, in 1867. His status as a bullfighter was confirmed in Madrid shortly thereafter, under the supervision of Rafael Guerra Bejarano, with whom he traded off mano a mano in a fight with bulls from the Bañuelos ranch. 

While he was seen as promising by fans early in his career, his time as a bullfighter eventually came to a tragic end. On 12 September, 1899, at the Fitero bullring, the bull "Cantinero" of the  jumped the barrier behind him and severely gored his thigh. Pepete died the following day.

References 

1867 births
1899 deaths
People from San Fernando, Cádiz
Sportspeople from the Province of Cádiz
Spanish bullfighters
Bullfighters killed in the arena
Sport deaths in Spain